Baisui Palace is a Buddhist temple located on the top of Chaxiao Peak, in Chizhou, Anhui, China. Over the course of 400 years, the temple was destroyed and rebuilt several times, due to war and natural disasters. Alongside Zhiyuan Temple, Dongyan Chan Temple and Ganlu Temple, it was venerated as one of the "Four Great Buddhist Temples in Mount Jiuhua".

History

Ming dynasty
The temple was first built in the Wanli period (1573–1620) of the Ming dynasty (1368–1644) by monk Haiyu, who more commonly known as "Master Wuxia". Haiyu died by age 110, his body became a mummy.

Qing dynasty
The temple underwent five renovations in the whole Qing dynasty (1644–1911). In 1717 in the reign of Kangxi Emperor (1662–1722), a disastrous fire consumed the temple, and it was restored in 1721 by abbot Sancheng. It was refurbished and redecorated in 1814 and 1826 respectively.

In 1853, in the ruling of Xianfeng Emperor, most of the temple buildings were destroyed during the war between the Taiping Rebellion of the Qing army.

Part of the temple was destroyed by fire in the late Guangxu period (1875–1908). The mummy of Haiyu, gold seal, jade seal survived.

Republic of China
From 1931 to 1953, monk Changdi, Juezhen, Wuguang and Xinmiao successively served as abbot of the temple.

People's Republic of China
After the 3rd Plenary Session of the 11th Central Committee of the Chinese Communist Party, the local government refurbished and redecorated the temple in 1982.

The temple has been designated as National Key Buddhist Temple in Han Chinese Area by the State Council of China in 1983.

Architecture
The existing main buildings include the Shanmen, Mahavira Hall, Body Hall, Dining Hall, storehouse, and monk's House.

References

Buddhist temples on Mount Jiuhua
Buildings and structures in Chizhou
Tourist attractions in Chizhou
18th-century establishments in China
18th-century Buddhist temples
Religious buildings and structures completed in 1721